Ma Shaorong (born 13 December 1970) is a Chinese archer. She competed in the women's individual and team events at the 1988 Summer Olympics.

References

1970 births
Living people
Chinese female archers
Olympic archers of China
Archers at the 1988 Summer Olympics
Place of birth missing (living people)
Asian Games medalists in archery
Archers at the 1986 Asian Games
Asian Games silver medalists for China
Medalists at the 1986 Asian Games
20th-century Chinese women